Pakdi Chillananda (born 14 August 1946) is a Thai former cyclist. He competed in the individual road race at the 1964 Summer Olympics.

References

External links
 

1946 births
Living people
Pakdi Chillananda
Pakdi Chillananda
Cyclists at the 1964 Summer Olympics
Place of birth missing (living people)
Pakdi Chillananda